Alexander Joshua Solowitz (born December 15, 1979) is an American actor, composer, singer, dancer, and producer.

Solowitz was born in the San Fernando Valley, Los Angeles, California to a large Jewish family. He has a younger sister Aleeza Solowitz, a columnist who also works in the film industry and lives between Los Angeles and New York. He was in the fictional boy band 2ge+her portrayed in an MTV movie, as well as on the TV series of the same name. Later, he appeared on a number of television shows, including Everybody Loves Raymond, Just Shoot Me!, ER, No Ordinary Family, Cousin Skeeter, and Justified.

He also appeared as Dave in "One Shot, One Kill", a first-season episode of NCIS.

Solowitz appeared in the film Gardens of the Night with John Malkovich. He also played Brett in the 1999 film Never Been Kissed, Bobby "911" in the 2006 film Alpha Dog, and Sebastian in the 2012 dark comedy Small Apartments.

He voiced the character Richard Bates in the 2011 video game L.A. Noire and appeared in the 2014 film Bad Country.

References

External links

1979 births
Living people
American male composers
21st-century American composers
American male film actors
American male television actors
Jewish American male actors
People from the San Fernando Valley
2gether (band) members
21st-century American male musicians
21st-century American Jews